Needles and Pins may refer to:

 "Needles and Pins" (nursery rhyme), a children's nursery rhyme
 "Needles and Pins" (song), a song written by Jack Nitzsche and Sonny Bono, made famous by The Searchers
 "Needles and Pins", a song by Deftones from their self-titled album
 Needles and Pins (TV series), an American TV series
 Needles and Pins, a British TV documentary series focused on global tattoo culture.
 A form of paresthesia

See also

 Pins and Needles (disambiguation)